Alan Titley  (born 28 June 1947) is an Irish-language novelist, translator, playwright and professor. He also wrote columns under the name Crobhingne.

Early life
Titley was born in Cork and educated at Coláiste Chríost Rí, St. Patrick's College, Drumcondra and University College Dublin.

Career
He taught in Nigeria during the Biafra War. Later he was head of the Irish Department in Drumcondra from 1981. In 2003 he began to write a column in The Irish Times. In 2006 he was appointed Professor of Modern Irish in University College Cork. He retired in 2011. Titley was elected to the Royal Irish Academy in 2012. Awards won include The Butler Prize of the Irish American Cultural Institute, The Pater Prize for International Drama, The Stewart Parker Award for Drama from the BBC, and the Éilís Dillon Award for Children's Literature.

Bibliography

Irish
Lámh, Lámh Eile, 2018
 An Bhean Feasa, 2014
 An Chuallacht Léannta: ceiliúradh ar Íosánaigh agus Léann na Gaeilge, 2013
 Rabhadh Dánta, 2013
 Smuf, 2012
 Na Drámaí Garbha, 2011
 Scríbhneoirí faoi chaibidil, 2010
 Gluaiseacht, 2009
 An réabhlóid mar ghníomh dínite, 2007
 Tyda, 2006
 Beir leat do shár-Ghaeilg Súil siar agus ar aghaidh, 2004
 Amach, 2003
 Leabhar Nóra Ní Anluain: céad scéal ó cheartlár na cruinne, 1998
 Chun doirne: rogha aistí, 1996
 Fabhalscéalta, 1995
 An cogadh in aghaidh na critice, 1994
 An fear dána, 1993
 An t-úrscéal Gaeilge, 1991
 Tagann Godot, 1991  
 Eiriceachtaí agus Scéalta Eile, 1987
 Stiall fhial feola, 1980
 Méirscrí na treibhe, 1978
 Máirtín Ó Cadhain: clár saothair, 1975

English
 The Dirty Dust. Cré na Cille, 2015
 The History of the Irish Book, vol. II, 2013
 Nailing Theses:selected essays, 2011
 A pocket history of Gaelic culture, 2000

References

External links

Alan Titley on Goodreads

1947 births
Living people
Alumni of University College Dublin
Alumni of St Patrick's College, Dublin
Irish-language writers
20th-century Irish male writers
21st-century Irish male writers
Irish male dramatists and playwrights
Irish male novelists
Irish male poets
20th-century Irish dramatists and playwrights
21st-century Irish dramatists and playwrights
Irish satirists
20th-century Irish-language poets
21st-century Irish-language poets
Writers from Cork (city)
Translators to English
Translators from Irish
Translators to Irish
Irish translators
20th-century translators
21st-century translators
Academics of Dublin City University
Linguists from Ireland
Members of the Royal Irish Academy